Television is a 2012 Bangladeshi drama film based on changing social values and adoption of technology directed by Mostofa Sarwar Farooki and starring Kazi Shahir Huda Rumi, Chanchal Chowdhury, Mosharraf Karim, and Tisha. The film was selected as the Bangladeshi entry for the Best Foreign Language Film at the 86th Academy Awards.

Plot
As a leader of the local community, Chairman Amin (Shahir Huda Rumi)  bans every kind of image in his water-locked village in a specific part of rural Bangladesh. He even goes on to claim that imagination is also sinful since it gives one the license to infiltrate into any prohibited territory. But change is a desperate wind that is difficult to resist by shutting the window. The tension between this traditional window and modern wind grows to such an extent that it starts to leave a ripple effect on the lives of a group of typically colorful, eccentric, and emotional people living in that village which is embedded upon a sweet semi triangle love story involving the Chairman Amin's only son (Chanchal Chowdhury), a village girl (Nusrat Imrose Tisha) and their supporting connected employee (Mosharraf Karim). But at the very end of the film, Television, which Chairman Amin hated so much, comes to the rescue and helps to reach a transcendental state where he and his God are unified.

Cast
 Kazi Shahir Huda Rumi
 Chanchal Chowdhury
 Mosharraf Karim
 Nusrat Imrose Tisha
 Mukit Zakaria

Production 
The movie was directed by Mostofa Sarwar Farooki, who started out his career in television shows. The movie received the Asian Project Market 2010 of the Busan Festival. The movie was produced by Bangladeshi firm Chabial and had German co-producers.  The movie was shot in Chandpur, Laxmipur, Noakhali, and Dhaka.

Critical reception

Television gained generally positive reviews. The Hollywood Reporter described it as ushering in a new era in Bangladeshi movies. Closing film at the 17th Busan International Film Festival (world premiere). It was Bangladesh's submission for Best Foreign Language Film at the 86th Academy Awards.

It won the Golden Hanuman Award at the 8th Jogja-NETPAC Asian Film Festival. It won the NETPAC award at the 19th Kolkata International Film Festival. It got a Special mention in the Muhr AsiaAfrica category at the 9th Dubai International Film Festival. It was screened at the 18th International Film Festival of Kerala, and the 37th Portland International Film Festival. As Television was screened in the Busan International Film Festival, it was subsequently released in South Korea on 7 November 2013.

See also
 List of submissions to the 86th Academy Awards for Best Foreign Language Film
 List of Bangladeshi submissions for the Academy Award for Best Foreign Language Film

References

External links

 

2012 films
2012 drama films
Bengali-language Bangladeshi films
Bangladeshi drama films
2010s Bengali-language films
Films scored by Hridoy Khan
Films produced by Mostofa Sarwar Farooki
Films directed by Mostofa Sarwar Farooki